Bokjeong station is a station on the Seoul Subway Line 8 and Suin-Bundang Line. This station has one of the most sophisticated and convenient transfer systems in the Seoul Metropolitan Subway in which the Suin-Bundang Line platform is directly beneath the Line 8 platform. Passengers can transfer between the lines simply by taking one flight of stairs/escalators. However, since the station is situated directly below a major highway interchange with no nearby residential or industrial area, the vicinity of the station has no significant source of passengers, so this station is used mainly as a transfer point.

The only aboveground section of Line 8 lies at Namwirye, although this station & Sanseong are situated underground.

The station is within walking distance of Seoul International School in the city of Seongnam; this station is on the border between Seoul and Seongnam.

Station layout

Suin-Bundang Line

Line 8

Vicinity
Exit 1: Jangji-dong
Exit 2: Dong Seoul College, Bokjeong-dong
Exit 3: Segok-dong
Exit 4: Garden 5

References

Seoul Metropolitan Subway stations
Railway stations opened in 1996
Metro stations in Songpa District
Seoul Subway Line 8
Bundang Line